David Sourada (born 16 November 1974) is a Czech footballer who last played for MFK Karviná.

External links
 
 

1974 births
Living people
Czech footballers
Association football forwards
FK Teplice players
FC Akhmat Grozny players
MFK Vítkovice players
FK Chmel Blšany players
Czech expatriate footballers
Expatriate footballers in Russia